Farrar is an unincorporated community in Jasper County, Georgia, United States.  The community is located along Highway 142 approximately fifty miles southeast of Atlanta, Georgia.

Demographics

Farrar, Georgia was first recorded in the 1930 census. As Farrar is no longer an incorporated town, census data is no longer collected on the community as a whole.

References

Unincorporated communities in Jasper County, Georgia
Unincorporated communities in Georgia (U.S. state)